Blake Paulson, a career national bank examiner, was the Acting Comptroller of the Currency. Paulson became Acting Comptroller of the Currency on January 14, 2021, upon the resignation of Acting Comptroller of the Currency Brian P. Brooks. As Acting Comptroller of the Currency, Mr. Paulson was the administrator of the federal banking system and chief officer of the Comptroller of the Currency (OCC). 

Paulson previously served concurrently as the chief operating officer (COO) of the OCC and senior deputy comptroller for midsize and community bank supervision. As COO, he was responsible for OCC management operations, oversight of staff responsible for systemic risk identification and analytical support, and the Specialty Supervision System. He was designated the chief national bank examiner in April 2020. 

In his role as senior deputy comptroller for midsize and community banks, Paulson was responsible for supervising 1,100 national banks and federal savings associations, and 1,600 OCC employees. Prior to that, he served as associate deputy comptroller and later, as deputy comptroller for the agency's Central District where he was responsible for the oversight of community banks and federal savings associations, independent data service providers, and trust companies across the upper Midwest.

In the 1990s, Paulson was the assistant deputy comptroller for midsize bank supervision where he was responsible for a portfolio of national banks with total assets between $10 billion and $30 billion.

On May 10, 2021, Paulson was succeeded in his role as Acting Comptroller of the Currency by Michael J. Hsu.

Paulson joined the OCC in 1986 in Sioux Falls, South Dakota. He has a Bachelor of Science in business administration from the University of South Dakota.

References

Attribution

Living people
United States Comptrollers of the Currency
Trump administration personnel
Biden administration personnel
University of South Dakota alumni
Place of birth missing (living people)
Date of birth missing (living people)
Year of birth missing (living people)